Rex Bell (born George Francis Beldam; October 16, 1903 – July 4, 1962) was an American actor and politician. Bell primarily appeared in Western films during his career. He also appeared in the 1930 movie True to the Navy, starring Clara Bow; Bell and Bow married the following year. 

Bell later became involved in politics with the Nevada Republican Party and was the 21st lieutenant governor of Nevada from 1955 until his death in 1962.

Early years 
Bell was born George Francis Beldam in Chicago on October 16, 1903.

Film career
Bell made his film debut in Wild West Romance in 1928, and went on to act in a number of films, mostly Westerns, in which he had the lead role. Fox Film executives were reported to be grooming Bell to be a successor to Tom Mix. He left the movie industry in 1936, although he had generally small roles in a few later films.

In 1931, Bell and his wife, actress Clara Bow, founded the Walking Box Ranch, at Searchlight, Nevada.

His final film appearance was an uncredited but very prominent role as a loquacious old cowboy in a bar and attending a rodeo in John Huston's The Misfits (1961) starring Clark Gable and Marilyn Monroe.

Political career

In 1944, Bell ran for the United States House of Representatives on the Republican ticket against Democrat Berkeley Bunker. The Nevada State Journal commented on November 1: "He has made friends where ever he appeared, but consensus is that the time is too short to overcome a handicap of not being so well known as his opponent". The election was held November 7, and Bell got 19,096 votes while Bunker received 36,648.

Bell was the leader of the Nevada Republican Party and in 1948 was an alternate to the Republican National Convention. He was also active in the Nevada Chamber of Commerce and Boy Scouts.

The ties Bell forged during those years helped him win the Lieutenant Governor's office in 1954.  That election year, Charles H. Russell, the incumbent Republican governor, also won.  In 1958, Democrat Grant Sawyer unseated Russell, but Bell won re-election as Lieutenant Governor (Bell and his Nevada state political position are mentioned in John D. MacDonald's 1960 novel The Only Girl in the Game). Bell died after giving a campaign speech on July 4th, 1962, while running for governor, still in office, of a heart attack in 1962, at the El Rancho Vegas in Las Vegas.

Other activities

Television
Bell was host of the program Cowboys and Injuns in 1950. It began on a station in Los Angeles and went on to be broadcast on ABC. The show focused on legends that were derived from folklore of cowboys and Native Americans in the United States.

Business
Bell operated Rexco, Incorporated, which manufactured and distributed novelty gift items. He and his brother also had two clothing stores in Nevada.

Personal life
Bell married actress Clara Bow in 1931. They had two sons, Tony Beldam, who changed his name to Rex Anthony Bell Jr., and George Beldam Jr.  Rex Bell Jr. appeared in two Western films—Stage to Thunder Rock (1964), in the role of "Shotgun Rex", and Young Fury (1965), and later served as district attorney of Clark County from 1987 to 1995. 

Bell died of a heart attack on July 4, 1962, a few hours after attending a political rally and picnic in Las Vegas.

The Rex Bell Elementary School in Las Vegas was named in honor of Bell.

Filmography

References

External links
 

 
 
 

1903 births
1962 deaths
Male actors from Chicago
Politicians from Chicago
American actor-politicians
American male film actors
American male silent film actors
Burials at Forest Lawn Memorial Park (Glendale)
Lieutenant Governors of Nevada
Nevada Republicans
Male Western (genre) film actors
20th-century American male actors
People from Searchlight, Nevada
20th-century American politicians